Feketić (or ) is a village located in the Mali Iđoš municipality, in the North Bačka District of Serbia. It is situated in the Autonomous Province of Vojvodina. The village has a Hungarian ethnic majority and its population numbering 4,308 people, including 2,672 Hungarians (2002 census).

History
The settlement is first mentioned in 1465 as Feketehegyház.

Historical population
1961: 5,387
1971: 4,818
1981: 4,688
1991: 4,542

Notable people
 Maurice Krishaber, naturalised French Hungarian otorhinolaryngologist.
 Ana Pešikan, former Minister of Science and Technology in the Government of Serbia.
Yuri Schwebler, conceptual artist

See also
 List of places in Serbia
 List of cities, towns and villages in Vojvodina

References
 Slobodan Ćurčić, Broj stanovnika Vojvodine, Novi Sad, 1996.

External links 

 History of Feketić 
 Street Map 

Places in Bačka
Populated places in North Bačka District
Hungarian communities in Serbia